The Ministry of General Administration सामान्य प्रशासन विभाग, महाराष्ट्र शासन is a ministry of the Government of Maharashtra. It is responsible for preparing annual plans for the development of Maharashtra state.

The Ministry is headed by a cabinet level Minister. Eknath Shinde is Current Minister of General Administration. and Chief Minister of Maharashtra.

Office

List of Cabinet Ministers

List of Ministers of State

List of Principal Secretaries
 ManuKumar Srivastava

See also 
Chief Minister's Office (Maharashtra)
Deputy Chief Minister's Office (Maharashtra)

References 

Government ministries of Maharashtra